Aly is an unincorporated community in Yell County, Arkansas, United States, located on Arkansas Highway 27,  south-southwest of Danville.

References

Unincorporated communities in Yell County, Arkansas
Unincorporated communities in Arkansas